The Hishigten (Khalkha-Mongolian: Хишигтэн/Hishigten) are one of the Southern Mongol ethnic groups. Today, they live in Heshigten Banner of China.

History 

They are believed to be the descendants of the Kheshig, the imperial guard of the Mongol Empire.

See also 

 Demographics of China
 Mongols in China
 List of medieval Mongolian tribes and clans
 Southern Mongolian dialect

Southern Mongols